Equatorial Current can refer to:
Equatorial Counter Current
North Equatorial Current
South Equatorial Current